Gaëtan Deneuve (born 3 May 1985) is a French football goalkeeper.

Career
In June 2017, Deneuve signed with Football Bourg-en-Bresse Péronnas 01.

References

External links
 
 Profile at Soccerway

1985 births
Living people
People from Harfleur
Association football goalkeepers
French footballers
Le Havre AC players
LB Châteauroux players
Stade Brestois 29 players
ÉFC Fréjus Saint-Raphaël players
Football Bourg-en-Bresse Péronnas 01 players
Ligue 2 players
Sportspeople from Seine-Maritime
Footballers from Normandy